Siddhapuram is a village in
Yadadri Bhuvanagiri district in Telangana, India. It falls under Atmakur mandal. There is a popular temple called as Sri Sita Ramanjaneya Swamy Temple in the village.

References

Villages in Yadadri Bhuvanagiri district